Bases Loaded '96: Double Header (known in Japan as Moero!! Pro Yakyuu '95: Double Header) is a 1995 sports video game released for the Sega Saturn and the Sony PlayStation. This game was the eighth and final game in the Bases Loaded series and the only one developed internally by Jaleco, after Tose had developed the previous seven installments. Like Super Bases Loaded 3, Double Header was licensed by the Major League Baseball Players Association (MLBPA) and uses real MLB players, but it was not licensed by Major League Baseball itself (MLB); all stats and attributes reflected the 1995 MLB season.

Reception

Next Generations brief review of the PlayStation version stated: "Jaleco's long-running baseball series ran out of steam long ago, and this totally disappointing 32-bit incarnation is a perfect reason to let it die". They scored both it and the Saturn version one out of five stars.

References

1995 video games
Bases Loaded video games
Jaleco games
PlayStation (console) games
Sega Saturn games
Multiplayer and single-player video games
Video games developed in Japan